Heinrich Krumpfholz (born 19 March 1925) is an Austrian former water polo player who competed in the 1952 Summer Olympics.

References

1925 births
Living people
Austrian male water polo players
Olympic water polo players of Austria
Water polo players at the 1952 Summer Olympics